Aaron Bowen (born 10 February 1999) is an English international boxer. He has represented England at the Commonwealth Games and is a double national champion.

Biography
Bowen won gold at the Commonwealth Youth Games in 2017 and made his first appearance for Great Britain in North Macedonia during 2021, winning gold again. He is a double National champion winning the light-heavyweight title in 2019 and 2021.

In 2022, he was selected for the 2022 Commonwealth Games in Birmingham where he competed in men's light heavyweight division.

References

1999 births
Living people
English male boxers
British male boxers
Boxers at the 2022 Commonwealth Games
Commonwealth Games competitors for England
20th-century English people
21st-century English people
Commonwealth Games bronze medallists for England
Commonwealth Games medallists in boxing
Medallists at the 2022 Commonwealth Games